Guridi is a surname. Notable people with the surname include:

Jesús Guridi (1886–1961), Spanish Basque composer
Jon Guridi (born 1995), Spanish footballer
José Guridi, Argentine humorist
José Miguel Guridi y Alcocer (1763–1828), Spanish-Mexican politician
Máximo de Meana y Guridi (c. 1840–c. 1912), Spanish soldier and politician
Yayo Guridi (born 1965), Argentine actor and comedian